Ameer Ali may refer to:

Ameer Ali (academic), economic professor and former chairman of Muslim organizations in Australia
Syed Ameer Ali (1849–1928), Judge and translator of Quran
Amir Khan (singer) (1912–1974), Hindustani classical vocalist
 Ameer Ali Shihabdeen (born 1961), Sri Lankan politician